Bennett Pang Kin-san (born 7 April 1949) is a Hong Kong musician, singer and actor. He is well known as the lead guitarist of The Wynners. He is currently a host of Pleasure & Leisure, a talk show produced by Television Broadcasts Limited.

Filmography

References

1949 births
Living people
Hong Kong guitarists
Lead guitarists
Chinese rock guitarists
Cantopop singer-songwriters
Hong Kong Buddhists
Hong Kong songwriters
Hong Kong male film actors
20th-century Hong Kong male singers
Hong Kong Mandopop singers
Hong Kong male television actors
20th-century guitarists
21st-century guitarists
21st-century Hong Kong male singers